Himalaya is the book that Michael Palin wrote to accompany the BBC television documentary series Himalaya with Michael Palin.

This book, like the other books that Michael Palin wrote following each of his seven trips for the BBC, consists both of his text and of many photographs to illustrate the trip. All of the pictures in this book were taken by Basil Pao, the stills photographer who was part of the team who did the trip (Pao also produced a book, Inside Himalaya, containing many more of his pictures).

The book contains eight chapters: Pakistan, India, Nepal, Tibet, Yunnan (China), Nagaland and Assam(India), Bhutan, and Bangladesh. The book is presented in a diary format; Palin starts each section of the book with a heading such as "Day Forty One: Srinagar". Not all days are mentioned, a result of the trip as a whole being broken up into shorter trips (a fact that is not mentioned in the series).

Other encounters and experiences that are related by Michael Palin include finding out that the Dalai Lama not only knew who he was, but was a fan of Palin's TV programmes.

Audio edition 
This book is available as an audiobook, read by Michael Palin. There are two versions available. The abridged version lasts 6 hours and the unabridged version 11 hours, 30 minutes.

External links 
Full text of Himalaya at Palin's Travels 

British travel books
2004 non-fiction books
Books by Michael Palin
Books about the Himalayas
Weidenfeld & Nicolson books
English non-fiction books